One of Those People that Live in the World is a 1973 New Zealand film directed by Paul Maunder.

Synopsis
This is about a woman's mental health crisis. In the first part Julie is haunted by her birth mother's breakdown. Julie hopes marriage and a job will overcome her problems, and falls pregnant. Following a traumatic delivery, Julie suffers an acute episode and is admitted into care. The second part is in a psychiatric hospital where drugs, electroconvulsive therapy and art therapy were used as standard treatments.

Cast

References 

1973 films
1970s New Zealand films
1970s English-language films
National Film Unit